Jazz Gunn (subtitled Shelly Manne & His Men Play Henry Mancini's music for the Film "Gunn") is an album by drummer Shelly Manne recorded in 1967, featuring music by Henry Mancini written for the motion picture Gunn, and released on the Atlantic label.

Reception

The AllMusic site rated the album 2 stars.

Track listing
All compositions by Henry Mancini
 "A Bluish Bag" - 7:18
 "Silver Tears" - 5:20
 "Sweet" - 6:49
 "Theme for Sam" - 4:38
 "A Quiet Happening" - 5:39
 "Night Owl" - 4:55
 "Peter Gunn" - 3:41

Personnel
Shelly Manne - drums
Conte Candoli - trumpet, flugelhorn
Frank Strozier - alto saxophone, flute
Mike Wofford - piano
Monty Budwig - bass

References

1967 albums
Atlantic Records albums
Shelly Manne albums
Albums produced by Nesuhi Ertegun